Michelle K. Ryan (born 1973) is a Professor of Social and Organisational Psychology at the University of Exeter and (part-time) Professor of Diversity at the University of Groningen, The Netherlands.

Education
She completed her undergraduate and a Ph.D. study in psychology from Australian National University in 2004 for her thesis ‘A gendered self or a gendered context? A self-categorization appraisal of gender differences’.

Research
Her research focuses on gender and gender differences, particularly the impact of gender in the workplace.

Together with Alex Haslam, she coined the term "glass cliff" to describe how the experiences of women who have broken through the glass ceiling differ from those of their male counterparts. Their idea was named by the New York Times as one of the ideas that shaped 2008. The term was shortlisted as Word of the Year by the Oxford English Dictionary in 2016.

Fellowships and other activity
In 2004 she was awarded a Research Councils UK academic fellowship. She was Associate Editor for the British Journal of Social Psychology between 2010 and 2012. In 2014 she undertook a British Academy Mid-Career Fellowship to examine the role of identity in explaining perceptions of work-life balance. At the University of Exeter she has held the roles of Faculty Associate Dean (Research), Dean of Post-graduate Research and inaugural Director of the Exeter Doctoral College.

She holds a European Research Council Consolidator Grant examining the way in which context and identity shape and constrain women’s careers.

Ryan has been appointed director of the Global Institute for Women's Leadership at the Australian National University, with effect from 1 July 2021.

Selected publications 
 Ryan MK, Branscombe NR (2012). The Sage Handbook of Gender and Psychology., Sage.

 Barreto M, Ryan MK, Schmitt M (2009). The Glass Ceiling in the 21st Century: Understanding Barriers to Gender Equality. , APA.

 Ryan MK, Haslam, S.A. Wilson-Kovacs, M.D. Hersby, M.D. (2007). The Glass Cliff: Precariousness beyond the Glass Ceiling. A CIPD Executive Briefing.  London, Chartered Institute of Personnel and Development.

 Ryan MK, Haslam SA, Morgenroth T, Rink F, Stoker J, Peters K (2016). Getting on top of the glass cliff: Reviewing a decade of evidence, Explanations, and impact. Leadership Quarterly, 27(3), 446–455.

 Morgenroth T, Ryan MK, Peters K (2015). The motivational theory of role modeling: How role models influence role aspirants' goals. Review of General Psychology, 19(4), 465–483.

 Steffens NK, Haslam SA, Reicher SD, Platow MJ, Fransen K, Yang J, Ryan MK, Jetten J, Peters K, Boen F, et al (2014). Leadership as social identity management: Introducing the Identity Leadership Inventory (ILI) to assess and validate a four-dimensional model. Leadership Quarterly, 25(5), 1001–1024.

References

1973 births
Living people
Academics of the University of Exeter
Australian National University alumni